Edward Thomas McMullen Jr. (born May 1, 1964) is a Trump-supporting American political strategist and diplomat, who served as the United States Ambassador to Switzerland from 2017 to 2021.

Early life and education 
McMullen was born on May 1, 1964 in New York City, but mostly grew-up in Port Jefferson, New York, where he attended Port Jefferson High School, graduating in 1983, before studying Political Science at Hampden-Sydney College, a private college, located in Hampden Sydney, Virginia. He graduated in 1986 with a Bachelor of Arts in Political Science.

Career 

Prior to his appointment as Ambassador, he was the president of McMullen Public Affairs, an advertising and corporate public affairs company. In the 2002 election, he was a candidate in the Republican primary for South Carolina Secretary of State, losing to Mark Hammond who subsequently won the general election.

McMullen was involved with Trump's successful 2016 presidential campaign, acting as chairman of the candidate's South Carolina Republican primary efforts, helping to plan the 2016 Republican National Convention, and serving as a member of Trump's transition team and as vice chair of the Trump inaugural committee.

McMullen left office on January 17, 2021.

Family 
McMullen is married to Margaret Ann (née Wade) and has two children. Since his resignation from his Ambassador post in Switzerland, he moved back to Charleston, South Carolina.

References

External links
 Biography at McMullen Public Affairs
 Appearances on C-Span

1964 births
Living people
Place of birth missing (living people)
Hampden–Sydney College alumni
South Carolina Republicans
Trump administration personnel
Ambassadors of the United States to Switzerland
Ambassadors of the United States to Liechtenstein